The sack of Naples occurred in 1544 when Algerians captured the Bay of Naples and enslaved 7,000 Italians.

In 1544 Algerian corsairs sailed into the Bay of Naples and captured it. They then took an astounding amount of 7,000 Italian slaves. 

The number of slaves taken by the Algerians drove the price of slaves so low that it was said “you could swap a Christian for an onion”. Moreover, it was said to be “raining Christians in Algiers”.

References

1544 in military history
History of Naples
Barbary pirates